"Feck" (occasionally spelled "fek" or "feic") is a word that has several vernacular meanings and variations in Irish English, Scots, and Middle English.

Irish English
 The most popular and widespread modern use of the term is as a slang expletive in Irish English, employed as a less serious alternative to the expletive "fuck" to express disbelief, surprise, pain, anger, or contempt. It notably lacks the sexual connotations that "fuck" has,.
 It is also used as Irish slang meaning "throw" (e.g. "he fecked the remote control across the table at me".)
 It has also been used as a verb meaning "to steal" (e.g. "they had fecked cash out of the rector's room") or to discover a safe method of robbery or cheating.

Scots and Late Middle English
However, this Scots noun has additional significance:
 Efficacy; force; value; return
 Amount; quantity (or a large amount/quantity)
 The greater or larger part (when used with a definite article)

From the first sense can be derived "feckless", meaning witless, weak, or ineffective. "Feckless" remains a part of Modern English and Scottish English, and appears in a number of Scottish adages:

"Feckless folk are aye fain o ane anither."

"Feckless fools should keep canny tongues."

In his 1881 short story Thrawn Janet, Robert Louis Stevenson invokes the second sense of "feck" as cited above:

"He had a feck o' books wi' him—mair than had ever been seen before in a' that presbytery..."

Robert Burns uses the third sense of "feck" in the final stanza of his 1792 poem "Kellyburn Braes":

I hae been a Devil the feck o' my life,
Hey, and the rue grows bonie wi' thyme;
"But ne'er was in hell till I met wi' a wife,"
And the thyme it is wither'd, and rue is in prime

In the media
The Channel 4 sitcom Father Ted (19951998) helped to popularise the use of "feck" outside of Ireland (particularly in the UK, where Channel 4 is based) through liberal use of the word by alcoholic priest Father Jack.

In a 1998 interview on Nickelodeon, an appearance by the teenage Irish girl group B*Witched prompted a viewer complaint alleging that one of its members had said "fuck off" on air. Nickelodeon maintained that the singer had in fact said "feck off", which they described as "a phrase made popular by the Channel 4 sitcom Father Ted", but the phrase was still found to be in breach of the ITC Programme Code and the complaint was thus upheld.

In 2004, clothing retailer French Connection UK (best known for its infamous "FCUK" T-shirt) won a legal injunction in Dublin that barred a local business from printing and selling a T-shirt marked "FCEK: The Irish Connection".

In 2008, the Irish cider brand Magners received complaints relating to an advert it had posted around the UK in which a man tells bees to "feck off", with members of the public concerned that young children could be badly influenced by it. Magners claimed that the "feck off" mention in the advert was a "mild rebuff" to the bees rather than an expletive. The Advertising Standards Authority ruled that the poster was suitable for display.

See also

 Minced oath
 Cognate
 False cognate
 Hiberno-English – Turns of phrase
 Profanity
 Vulgarism
 PHECC

References

Sources
 Walker, Colin S. K. Scottish Proverbs. Edinburgh: Birlinn Limited, 1996. 
 Webster's College Dictionary. New York City: Random House, 1996. 
 Webster's Revised Unabridged Dictionary. Springfield, Massachusetts: G. & C. Merriam Company Co., 1913.
 Irish Slang
 Irish Dictionary Online

Father Ted
English profanity
Scots language
Scottish English
Interjections
Irish slang
English words